Gödöllői Ördögök RC is a Hungarian rugby club in Gödöllő. They currently play in Nemzeti Bajnokság II.

History
The club was founded in 2006.

Current squad

External links
  Gödöllői Ördögök RC blog

Hungarian rugby union teams
Rugby clubs established in 2006